The Centaurus A/M83 Group is a complex group of galaxies in the constellations Hydra, Centaurus, and Virgo.  The group may be roughly divided into two subgroups. The Cen A Subgroup, at a distance of 11.9 Mly (3.66 Mpc), is centered on Centaurus A, a nearby radio galaxy.  The M83 Subgroup, at a distance of 14.9 Mly (4.56 Mpc),  is centered on the Messier 83 (M83), a face-on spiral galaxy.

This group is sometimes identified as one group and sometimes identified as two groups.  Hence, some references will refer to two objects named the Centaurus A Group and the M83 Group.  However, the galaxies around Centaurus A and the galaxies around M83 are physically close to each other, and both subgroups appear not to be moving relative to each other.

The Centaurus A/M83 Group is part of the Virgo Supercluster, the local supercluster of which the Local Group is an outlying member.

Members

Member identification

The brightest group members were frequently identified in early galaxy group identification surveys.  However, many of the dwarf galaxies in the group were only identified in more intensive studies.  One of the first of these identified 145 faint objects on
optical images from the UK Schmidt Telescope and followed these up in hydrogen line emission with the Parkes Radio Telescope and in the hydrogen-alpha spectral line with the Siding Spring 2.3 m Telescope.  This
identified 20 dwarf galaxies as members of the group.  The HIPASS survey, which was a blind radio survey for hydrogen spectral line emission, found five uncatalogued galaxies in the group and also identified five previously-catalogued galaxies as members.  An additional dwarf galaxy was identified as a group member in the HIDEEP survey, which was a more intensive radio survey for hydrogen emission within a smaller region of the sky.  Several optical surveys later identified 20 more candidate objects to the group.
In 2007, the Cen A group membership of NGC 5011C was established. 

While this galaxy is a well-known stellar system 
listed with a NGC number, its true identity remained hidden because of coordinate confusion and wrong redshifts in the literature. From 2015 to 2017 a full optical survey was conducted using the Dark Energy Camera, covering 550 square degrees in the sky and doubling the number of known dwarf galaxies in this group. Another deep but spatially limited survey around Centaurus A revealed numerous new dwarfs.

The dwarf spheroidal galaxies of the Centaurus A group have been studied and have been found to have old, metal-poor stellar populations similar to those in the Local Group, and follow a similar metallicity–luminosity relation. One dwarf galaxy, KK98 203 (LEDA 166167), has an extended ring of Hα emission.

Member list

The table below lists galaxies that have been identified as associated with the Centaurus A/M83 Group by I. D. Karachentsev and collaborators.  Note that Karachentsev divides this group into two subgroups centered on Centaurus A and Messier 83.
 

Additionally, ESO 219-010, PGC 39032, and PGC 51659 are listed as possibly being members of the Centaurus A Subgroup, and ESO 381-018, NGC 5408, and PGC 43048 are listed as possibly being members of the M83 Subgroup.  Although HIPASS J1337-39 is only listed as a possible member of the M83 Subgroup in the later list published by Karachentsev, later analyses indicate that this galaxy is within the subgroup.
Saviane and Jerjen found that NGC 5011C has an optical redshift of 647 km/s and thus is a member of the Cen A group 
rather than of the distant Centaurus galaxy cluster as believed since 1983.

References

 
Galaxy clusters